The 1980 Mr. Olympia contest was an IFBB professional bodybuilding competition held on October 4, 1980, at the Sydney Opera House in Sydney, Australia.

The event was one of the most debated competitions in bodybuilding history. 
While training for his acting role in the 1982 film Conan the Barbarian, Arnold Schwarzenegger stunned the bodybuilding world by unexpectedly coming out of retirement and entering the Mr. Olympia contest one day prior to the event and after having trained for only eight weeks prior.  When asked about his decision to enter the competition, Arnold said "we're going to start shooting the first few scenes (of Conan) in October, and so I really wanted to be muscular because the idea was that Conan was a very muscular, heroic looking guy, and that I should be in top shape... the closer I came to this competition more people started speculating on the idea that I would be competing and the more I started thinking about the possibility.  And so around 3 weeks or 2 weeks ago I decided, well, I think it would be a kind of an interesting challenge to do something in 8 weeks that most of the guys do, preparing a year or two years in advance."

Frank Zane, the defending three-time Mr. Olympia champion, entered the contest after recovering from a life-threatening injury.
Although Zane had completely recovered and had retained his definition, much of his muscular size from the year before was missing.
Other favorites at the competition, including Mike Mentzer, Chris Dickerson, and Boyer Coe, were in excellent condition making the 1980 event one of the most competitive Mr. Olympia contests.

After the final judging, Arnold was declared the winner. The decision was criticized by competitors and attendees, because Arnold lacked his usual size and muscular definition.  Many audience members booed as the results were announced.  After accepting the runner-up position, Dickerson jumped off stage yelling "I can’t believe it!". Although Coe and Mentzer were tied for fourth in scoring, Mentzer was given the fifth place award.  Mentzer was outspoken in his belief that he was the victim of politics and conspiracy. Zane reportedly threw his trophy against the wall backstage.  During his acceptance speech, Arnold acknowledged how close the decision was, saying "I have to be very honest, that this was the highest level of competition that I have ever faced in any competition in my life".

In  the aftermath of the competition, many of the competitors, including Frank Zane, Coe, Mentzer, and Walker, vowed to boycott the 1981 contest. 
CBS Television attended and filmed the 1980 contest but decided not to air the contest on broadcast television as planned. It was the last time the Mr. Olympia contest was filmed by an American broadcast television network.

Results

Total prize money awarded was $50,000.

Notable events

 Arnold Schwarzenegger won his seventh Mr. Olympia and officially retired from professional bodybuilding.
 Unlike the 1975-1979 Mr. Olympia contests which had two weight divisions (above and below 200lbs), this contest had no weight divisions, returning to the 1965-1973 format where large and small bodybuilders competed directly against one another.
 The loss and resulting controversy had a major impact on Mike Mentzer personally and professionally, and it would be the last time he competed in professional bodybuilding.
 According to Chris Dickerson, "the promoter was a real low life, a bigot, who had a real dislike for me –partly on racial grounds and partly for my sexual orientation." Paul Graham even told another official that "Chris couldn't win because he was a fag."

References

External links 
 Mr. Olympia

 1980
1980 in Australian sport
Sports competitions in Sydney
1980 in bodybuilding
Bodybuilding competitions in Australia
1980s in Sydney
Sydney Opera House
October 1980 sports events in Australia